JFK Revisited: Through the Looking Glass is a 2021 American-British documentary film about the assassination of John F. Kennedy directed by Oliver Stone, based on the 1992 non-fiction book Destiny Betrayed: JFK, Cuba, and the Garrison Case by James DiEugenio and on newly declassified evidence about the case. It premiered on July 12, 2021, in the Cannes Premiere section at the 2021 Cannes Film Festival.

Stone described it as "an important bookend to my 1991 film. It ties up many loose threads, and hopefully repudiates much of the ignorance around the case and the movie". The film is narrated by Whoopi Goldberg and Donald Sutherland.

Synopsis
After the 1991 film JFK, Congress enacts the President John F. Kennedy Assassination Records Collection Act of 1992, establishing a review board to declassify assassination-related documents. The film disputes the chain of evidence for the "single bullet" that caused wounds to Kennedy and Governor John Connally. Researcher Barry Ernest, author of the 2010 JFK book The Girl on the Stairs, is interviewed about alleged witness statements purportedly casting doubt on the timeline of Lee Harvey Oswald's movements immediately after the assassination.

Interviewees featured in the film include:
 John R. Tunheim
 Dr. Henry Lee
 Robert F. Kennedy, Jr., nephew of President John F. Kennedy.
 James K. Galbraith
 David Talbot
 Cyril Wecht

Production
The film was produced by Ixtlan Productions and Pantagruel Productions with funding by Ingenious Media.

Release
It was released on video on demand on November 12, 2021, and was televised on Showtime on November 22, 2021. It was theatrically released in the U.K. and Ireland by Altitude Film Distribution on November 26, 2021.

References

External links
 

2021 films
2021 documentary films
American documentary films
Films directed by Oliver Stone
Films scored by Jeff Beal
Documentary films about the assassination of John F. Kennedy
2020s English-language films
2020s American films